Asbjørn Wahl (born 1951) is a Norwegian researcher and author.

He is currently the director of the Campaign for the Welfare State, an adviser for the Norwegian Union of Municipal and General Employees, and the Vice President of the Road Transport Workers’ Section of the International Transport Workers' Federation.

Notable publications include The Rise and Fall of the Welfare State, released November 2011.

External links

http://www.social-europe.eu/author/asbjorn-wahl/
http://transform-network.net/journal/issue-112012/news/detail/Journal/asbjoern-wahl-on-the-rise-and-fall-of-the-welfare-state.html

1951 births
Living people
Norwegian trade unionists